Super Amazing Wagon Adventure (also Super Amazing Wagon Adventure Turbo) is a 2D action-adventure video game developed by sparsevector.

Design 
The game adopts a retro theme, with graphics very similar to 8-bit games and has an optional CRT style display. It is a parody of The Oregon Trail, but with modern music. Its follows a story line, but with random sequences that change scenes every 3–30 seconds with unpredictable attack and obstacle patterns. The latest version is released on Windows platform and Xbox. The game can be beaten in 10 minutes, however due to randomness of the game it often takes longer to complete the game. It was developed using .NET Framework and XNA Engine.

Plot 
It is a story of three persons with a trusty wagon who have to cross the west between 1830 and 1870.

Gameplay 
The player controls the three migrants in the game. The objective is to shoot animals or enemies and survive obstacles within a given story. In the beginning the player selects characters and a wagon. The three characters can contract diseases that decrease their life points. The life points can be refilled by health packs or be traded for fur if the trader is encountered. Every animal killed in the game can be collected for trading purposes. However, touching the dead skunk causes a character to take one heart of damage. It has decision points which affects the gameplay depending on the player's choices. The game does not allow points to be saved. Every challenge in the game can unlock new survival mode games or a new wagon. It has intentional glitches that unlock the glitch wagon.

Development 
Super Amazing Wagon Adventure is the first game developed by sparsevector. It was started as a group project.

References

External links 
 
 
Action-adventure games
Microsoft XNA games
Windows games
Xbox 360 games
Xbox 360 Live Indie games